Meridian High School is a senior high school located in Mounds, Illinois, United States, serving grades 9–12.

References

Public high schools in Illinois
Schools in Pulaski County, Illinois